"Love Bug", also spelled "Lovebug," is a song by American country music artist George Jones. Jones' version, which also features a young Johnny Paycheck on backup vocals and draws heavily from the Bakersfield sound as popularized by Buck Owens, reached #6 on the Billboard Hot Country Singles chart in 1965. It was released on his July 1965 New Country Hits album and then re-released as the lead song for his 1966 album of the same name, Love Bug.

Recording and composition
"Love Bug" was written by Wayne Kemp and Curtis Wayne. Lyrically, the song celebrates the giddiness of new love that's "got the whole world shook up."  Musically, the original Jones version is an unmistakable nod to the Bakersfield sound, from the treble on the guitars to George's elongated delivery at the start, "Oh...that...little bitty teeny weeny thing they call the love bug," which is reminiscent of Owens hits like "Love's Gonna Live Here" and "I've Got a Tiger By the Tail".  Several alternate takes of the song can be heard on the Jones box set Walk Through This World with Me: The Complete Musicor Recordings 1965-1971, including a version with an overdriven electric guitar solo and harmonica that makes it sound more like a Rolling Stones record of the time than either Nashville or Bakersfield.  Jones later recorded the song as a duet with Vince Gill on the 1994 album The Bradley Barn Sessions.

George Strait version
George Strait released a cover of the song in February 1994 as the third single from his album Easy Come Easy Go. Strait's version reached #8 on the Billboard Hot Country Singles & Tracks chart in May 1994.

Chart performance

George Jones version

George Strait version
"Love Bug" re-entered the U.S. Billboard Hot Country Singles & Tracks chart at number 74 as an official single for the week of March 5, 1994.

References

1965 songs
1965 singles
1994 singles
George Jones songs
George Strait songs
Songs written by Wayne Kemp
Song recordings produced by Tony Brown (record producer)
Musicor Records singles
MCA Records singles
Song recordings produced by Pappy Daily